The Fall of Saruj in 1145 saw the main surviving Frankish fortress of Edessa fall to the Zengids.

Following his great victory in the Siege of Edessa in 1144 Imad al-Din Zengi marched towards Saruj, the main surviving fortress of Edessa situated east of the Euphrates. The Frankish fortress of Saruj fell to Zengi in January 1145.

References

Battles involving the Zengid dynasty
Battles involving the Seljuk Empire